The Bellona Platform is a submarine geological feature encompassing the Chesterfield Islands  and Bellona Reefs  west of New Caledonia. It was once a  landmass, which became mostly submerged when sea levels rose at the end of the Last Glacial Maximum, 20,000 years ago. It might have played a role in the spread of flora and fauna, including humans, in the southwest Pacific.

References

Former islands
Geography of New Caledonia
Plateaus of the Pacific Ocean
Coral Sea